{{Infobox university
| name = PERI Institute of Technology
| native_name = 
| native_name_lang = 
| image = 
| image_size = 
| image_alt = 
| caption = 
| latin_name = 
| other_name =          
| former_name =         
| motto = 
| motto_lang = 
| mottoeng = 
| established =  
| closed =              
| type = Private
| parent = 
| affiliation = Anna University, Chennai
| religious_affiliation =
| academic_affiliation =
| endowment = 
| budget = 
| chairman = Saravanan Periasamy
| chancellor = 
| president = Periasamy Karupanna Gounder
| vice-president = 
| superintendent = Sasikumar Veerarajan
| provost = 
| vice_chancellor= 
| rector = 
| principal =  R. Palson Kennedy
| dean = 
| director = 
| head_label = 
| head = 
| academic_staff = 
| administrative_staff = Vignesh
| students = 2000
| undergrad = 
| postgrad = 
| doctoral = 
| other = 
| city = PERI Knowledge Park, Mannivakkam, West Tambaram, Chennai| state = Tamil Nadu
| province = 
| country = India
| coor = 
| campus = 17 Acre Greenish Campus
| language = 
| free_label = 
| free = 
| colors =              
| athletics = 
| sports = 
| athletics_nickname =  
| mascot =              
| sporting_affiliations = 
| website =             
| logo = 
| footnotes = 
}}PERI Institute of Technology''' is an engineering college in West Tambaram, Tamil Nadu, India. The college is affiliated with Anna University, Chennai and has been approved by the All India Council for Technical Education.

History
PERI Institute of Technology was established in 2010 by the PERI Educational and Charitable Trust, PERI Educational and Charitable Trust was founded in 2007.

References

Engineering colleges in Chennai
Colleges affiliated to Anna University
Educational institutions established in 2010
2010 establishments in Tamil Nadu